Albert Henry Rosewig (he spelled it Albert RoSewig) (29 April 1846 – 7 May 1929) was an American composer from Philadelphia, Pennsylvania, born in Hanover.  He was an influential and modernist composer of hymns. 

Rosewig is generally acknowledged as the most important American composer of Roman Catholic liturgical music in his time.  He operated a publishing house in Philadelphia for his own works and those of others whereby his works were disseminated nationally.  He was the music director of St. Charles Borromeo church in Philadelphia from about 1880 to 1919. 

He had his opponents and in 1919 they took their case to the Vatican.  He was charged with harmonizing and embellishing Gregorian chants.  Pope Benedict XV issued an edict against what he was doing.  This edict effectively ended his career.  He spent his last ten years in seclusion.

References

External links
 
 Chapter about A. Rosewig in The Hymn Writers of Early Pennsylvania by L. E. Carroll at books.google.com
 

1846 births
1929 deaths
American male composers
American composers
Musicians from Philadelphia
Musicians from Hanover